Norma W. Andrews is a cell biologist and professor at the University of Maryland Department of Cell Biology and Molecular Genetics. She chaired the department from 2009 to 2014.

Education and career
Norma Andrews received her B.S. in 1977 and Ph.D. in 1983, both from the University of São Paulo. She then went on to a postdoctoral fellowship in the laboratory of Victor Nussenzweig at New York University, which she completed in 1990. She then began her own laboratory at Yale University as an assistant professor. In 2009, Andrews moved her lab to the University of Maryland to chair the Department of Cell Biology and Molecular Genetics. She stepped down from that position in 2014.

Research
Andrews' research has focused on cell biology of and in response to the parasitic eukaryote Trypanosoma cruzi. Her group is known for discovering and characterizing calcium-dependendent exocytosis of lysosomes in mammalian cells, and its role in repair of the plasma membrane.

Notable publications

Idone V, Tam C... Andrews NW (2008). Repair of injured plasma membrane by rapid Ca2+ dependent endocytosis. Journal of Cell Biology. 180(5): pgs. 905-914
Reddy A, Caler EV, Andrews NW (2001). Plasma membrane repair is mediated by Ca2+-regulated exocytosis of lysosomes. Cell. 106(2): pgs. 157-169
Martinez I, Chakrabarti S... Andrews NW (2000). Synaptotagmin vii regulated Ca2+-dependent exocytosis of lysosomes in fibroblasts. Journal of Cell Biology. 148(6): pgs. 1141-1149
Rodriguez A, Webster P... Andrews NW (1997). Lysosomes behave as Ca2+-regulated exocytic vesicles in fibroblasts and epithelial cells. Journal of Cell Biology. 137(1): pgs. 93-104
Tardieux I, Webster P... Andrews NW (1992). Lysosome recruitment and fusion are early events required for trypanosome invasion of mammalian cells. Cell. 71(7): pgs. 1117-1130
Andrews NW, Hong KS... Nussenzweig V (1987). Stage-specific surface antigens expressed during the morphogenesis of vertebrate forms of Trypanosoma cruzi. Experimental Parasitology. 64(3): pgs. 474-484

References

University of São Paulo alumni
University of Maryland, College Park faculty
Living people
Year of birth missing (living people)